Blunt dissection describes the careful separation of tissues along tissue planes by either fingers or convenient blunt instruments during many diverse surgical procedures.  Blunt dissection consumes a large proportion of time in most surgeries and has not changed significantly in centuries. It requires great skill, can be tedious, nerve-wracking, and risky.  Repairs are often required .  Blunt dissection is contrasted to sharp dissection, the practice of slicing through tissues with scalpels, scissors, electrosurgery, or other advanced technologies usually employing heat.  New devices are expected to soon make blunt dissection safer, faster and easier.


Use in pneumothorax
It is one method employed prior to the insertion of a chest drain following a pneumothorax. Following incision above the rib (to avoid the neurovascular bundle), blunt dissection of the subcutaneous tissue, external, internal and innermost intercostal muscles allows access to the pleura. Indeed, blunt dissection is now considered the favoured approach for the insertion of large bore chest tubes since it results in fewer complications.

References

External links
 Oxford Handbook of Clinical Medicine
 Tube Thoracostomy

Surgical procedures and techniques